Stack v Dowden [2007] UKHL 17 is a leading English property law case from the House of Lords case concerning the division of interests in family property after the breakdown of a cohabitation relationship.

Facts
Mr Stack, a self-employed builder and decorator and then employee of Hammersmith and Fulham LBC, and Ms Dowden, an electrical engineer with the London Electricity Board, had cohabited for almost 18 years and had four children from 1986 to 1991. They then bought a house in 1993 at 114 Chatsworth Road, Willesden Green, London. The property was registered in both their names, but they had not said what their respective shares were on the Land Registry Form. Usually this meant a presumption that they would share equally in the home. However, the purchase was funded by selling a house that was in Ms Dowden’s sole name, her savings and a joint loan, so she had given 65% of the purchase price. Mr Stack had kept his finances separate, but was living in the previous house since 1983 and had done many improvements. They always, or mostly, had had separate bank accounts, savings and investments.

Nine years after purchasing the house, their relationship broke down and they agreed a court order that excluded Mr Stack from the house and required Ms Dowden to pay Mr Stack for the cost of his alternative accommodation. Mr Stack then sought a declaration that the house was held upon trust by the couple as tenants in common and an order for its sale.

The High Court declared that they owned the property in equal shares. Ms Dowden appealed.

Judgment

Court of Appeal
The Court of Appeal overturned the High Court and ordered that the net proceeds be divided 65 per cent to her and 35 per cent to Mr Stack. The declaration as to the receipt for capital money in the transfer document could not be taken as an express declaration of trust, nor could it infer an intention that the beneficial ownership be equal, because there was no evidence that either of them had understood the declaration to carry such significance. The issues were whether a conveyance into joint names established a prima facie case of joint and equal beneficial interests and whether the Court of Appeal had been correct to overrule the judge's order that Ms Dowden compensate Mr Stack for the cost of his accommodation. Mr Stack appealed.

House of Lords
The House of Lords held that Ms Dowden owned a greater share than half the equity, and so although she and Mr Stack were joint tenants of the legal estate, Ms Dowden was entitled to a 65 per cent interest. Lord Hoffmann said he concurred with Baroness Hale. Lord Hope, gave a short judgment also concurring with Baroness Hale. He emphasised that, departing from Lloyds Bank plc v Rosset, when deciding whether a constructive trust existed,

Therefore, because the couple had maintained their financial independence from each other throughout their relationship, Lord Hope reasoned that the appeal should be dismissed.

Lord Walker, agreeing with the reasons given by Baroness Hale and having examined the precedent in detail, was also of the opinion that the appeal should be dismissed.

Baroness Hale identified that the onus is upon the person seeking to show that the beneficial ownership is different from the legal ownership and that the key question in cases such as this is “did the parties intend their beneficial interests to be different from their legal interests?”, although she acknowledged that cases of this type would be very unusual. Baroness Hale stated that, contrary to Lloyd's Bank plc v Rosset, many factors other than financial contributions may be relevant to divining the parties' true intentions, such as any discussions at the time of the transfer which cast light upon their intentions; the reasons why the home was acquired in their joint names; the nature of their relationship; whether they had children for whom they both had responsibility to provide a home; how the purchase was financed, both the initial purchase price and the subsequent mortgage payments; how the parties arranged their finances, whether separately or together or a bit of both; how they discharged their household expenses. Baroness Hale stated that these and other factors should be taken into account when deciding whether the parties' beneficial interests should be different from their legal interests and whether a constructive trust existed. Because the parties had kept their finances rigidly separate, Baroness Hale was of the opinion that, taking their entire course of conduct into account, the appeal by Mr Stack should be dismissed and the Court of Appeal's order of a 65/35 split in favour of Ms Dowden should stand. Lady Baroness Hale further states that the court can look at other elements such as, the purpose for the home which it was acquired for, whether they have children for whom they both have a reasonability to provide a home for and how they managed any outgoings on the property and other household expensed.

Lord Neuberger, dissenting in his reasoning (but not on the result of the 65 to 35 per cent split), advised against easy and frequent changes to law (especially by the judiciary rather than Parliament) that might give rise to new and unforeseen uncertainties and unfairnesses. He advocated the use of the resulting trust where evidence of factors other than direct financial contributions were absent and expressed concern about imputing intentions to the parties rather than inferring their intentions in light of their actions and statements - the former involves concluding what the parties would have intended whereas the latter involves concluding what they did intend. Lord Neuberger held that there were no grounds for varying the 65/35 split which he believed originated on the acquisition of the property and the establishment of a resulting trust. He was of the opinion that nothing other than "subsequent discussions, statements or actions, which can fairly be said to imply a positive intention to depart from that apportionment, will do to justify a change in the way in which the beneficial interest is owned." He thought that the facts that they lived together for a long time, have been in a loving relationship, have children, operated a joint bank account and shared the outgoings of the household could not of themselves indicate an intention to vary this unequal split, and that even payments on decoration, repairs, utilities and council tax did not suffice on their own without evidence of an express agreement to vary their shares. He agreed that the appeal should be dismissed, though for different reasons than the majority. Lord Rinkowski also agreed with this judgement.

See also

English land law
English trusts law
English property law
Dyer v Dyer (1788) 2 Cox 92
Pettitt v Pettitt [1970] AC 777
Burns v Burns [1984] Ch 317
Oxley v Hiscock [2004] EWCA Civ 546
Hapeshi v Allnatt [2010] EWHC 392 (Ch)
Abbott v Abbott [2007] UKPC 53
Jones v Kernott [2012] 1 All ER 1265, [2011] Fam Law 1338
Geary v Rankine [2012] EWCA 555

Notes

References
N Gravells (ed), Landmark Cases in Land Law (2013)

External links
The judgment of the case

English property case law
House of Lords cases
2007 in case law
2007 in England
2007 in British law